German submarine U-361 was a Type VIIC U-boat of Nazi Germany's Kriegsmarine during World War II.

She carried out three patrols. She did not sink or damage any ships.

She was a member of six wolfpacks.

She was sunk by a British aircraft west of Narvik on 17 July 1944.

Design
German Type VIIC submarines were preceded by the shorter Type VIIB submarines. U-361 had a displacement of  when at the surface and  while submerged. She had two shafts and two  propellers.

U-361 was fitted with five  torpedo tubes (four fitted at the bow and one at the stern), fourteen torpedoes, one  SK C/35 naval gun, 220 rounds, and two twin  C/30 anti-aircraft guns. The boat had a complement of between forty-four and sixty.

Service history
The submarine was laid down on 12 September 1941 at the Flensburger Schiffbau-Gesellschaft yard at Flensburg as yard number 480, launched on 9 September 1942 and commissioned on 18 December under the command of Kapitänleutnant Hans Seidel.

She served with the 8th U-boat Flotilla from 18 December 1942 and the 11th flotilla from 1 March 1944.

First patrol
U-359s first patrol took her from Kiel in Germany to Narvik in Norway.

Second patrol
Her second foray was toward Bear Island in the Barents Sea, then into the Norwegian Sea.

Third patrol and loss
U-361 left Narvik for the last time on 27 June 1944. On 17 July, she was sunk by depth charges dropped by a British Catalina flying boat of No. 210 Squadron RAF. The pilot, Flying Officer John Cruickshank was awarded the Victoria Cross.

52 men died in the U-boat; there were no survivors.

Previously recorded fate
U-361 was originally noted as sunk on 17 July 1944 by a British B-24 Liberator of 86 Squadron. This attack sank .

Wolfpacks
U-361 took part in six wolfpacks, namely:
 Boreas (29 February – 10 March 1944) 
 Thor (10 – 26 March 1944) 
 Blitz (2 – 5 April 1944) 
 Keil (5 – 20 April 1944) 
 Donner & Keil (20 – 23 April 1944) 
 Trutz (28 June – 10 July 1944)

References

Bibliography

External links

German Type VIIC submarines
U-boats commissioned in 1942
U-boats sunk in 1944
U-boats sunk by British aircraft
U-boats sunk by depth charges
1942 ships
Ships built in Flensburg
Ships lost with all hands
World War II submarines of Germany
World War II shipwrecks in the Norwegian Sea
Maritime incidents in July 1944